The Tashmoo was a sidewheeler steamboat on Lake St. Clair and Lake Huron. It was famous for being one of the fastest ships, at the time, on the Great Lakes.

Construction 
The Tashmoo was the first ship constructed in 1900 and was launched on December 31, 1899. It was built by the Detroit Shipbuilding Company in Wyandotte, Michigan for Detroit's White Star Steamship Company. The Tashmoo was nicknamed the "White Flyer" and, because of the number of windows on the ship, the "Glass Hack."

Operations 
The Tashmoo'''s regular route was from Detroit to Port Huron, Michigan. It made several stops along the way, including at its namesake, Tashmoo Park.

 Steamboat race 

After a race between the City of Chicago and the City of Milwaukee in September 1900, a Chicago–newspaper boasted that the winner (the City of Chicago) was the "fastest on the lakes". A paper in Detroit, Michigan subsequently listed nine vessels that could have easily beaten the City of Chicago. The list did not mention the Tashmoo. A. A. Parker, the president of the White Star Line, offered $1,000 to any ship that could beat the Tashmoo in a race. The president of the Cleveland Buffalo Transit Company accepted the challenge on behalf of his ship, the City of Erie.

The Tashmoo fell behind at the start of the race but quickly regained ground. It was forced to slow after going out of sight of the shore because the "wheelman was not used to steering [only] by compass." The Tashmoo was later forced to slow again due to an overheating condenser. The City of Erie eventually beat the Tashmoo by 45 seconds,  but the Tashmoo had been catching up to the City of Erie before the finish. A. A. Parker offered the  owners of the City of Erie $10,000 for a rematch, but they refused the offer, although they later admitted that the Tashmoo was the faster ship.

 End of service 
On December 8, 1927, the Tashmoo snapped its moorings during a gale and starting drifting up the Detroit River. It collided with a ferry and was found further upstream, stopped by the Belle Isle Bridge. Two tugboats pulled the Tashmoo away from bridge, but the cables broke again and the ship once again headed for the bridge. The ship was eventually repaired.

On June 18, 1936, the Tashmoo'' struck a submerged rock as it was leaving Sugar Island. It was eventually scrapped. It was entered into the National Maritime Hall of Fame in 1985.

References 

1899 ships
History of Detroit
Great Lakes ships
Ships built in Wyandotte, Michigan
Paddle steamers
Passenger ships of the United States
Maritime incidents in 1936
Shipwrecks of Canada